Dire Dawa International Airport , is an international airport serving Dire Dawa, a city in eastern Ethiopia.

Facilities 

Airlines and destinations

Accidents and incidents
On 27 August 1981, Douglas C-47B ET-AGX of RRC Air Services was written off when the port undercarriage collapsed on landing.
On 9 January 2020, an Ethiopian Airlines Boeing 737-700 registered ET-ALN operating flight ET363 was on approach to the airport, but flew through a swarm of desert locusts that obscured visibility from the cockpit. The crew depressurized the aircraft and manually cleaned the windscreens before attempting a second approach, but were faced with the same problem. After a second depressurization and manual cleaning, the flight diverted to Addis Ababa, its origin airport.

References

External links 
 

Airports in Ethiopia
Dire Dawa